Zoran Lekovic (born June 8, 1957) is a famous Yugoslav pop singer. He first rose to national prominence at the early age of 13 with First Prizes at the Sanremo Music Festival, Beogradsko Prolece Festival, and Golden Rose Festival in Portoroz with the song "Ljubomora" (meaning "Jealousy"). A teen sensation who played for Yugoslav president Tito, he continued his stardom as a singer, producer, performer, author of lyrics and composition in the Yugoslav pop scene, with numerous published No.1 Hits, including that of "Niko Niko", "Snezana" and "Ona Je Najlepsa". He has also produced numerous Eastern European pop stars, collecting many awards and generating a lot of airplay along the way. He is an alumnus of the Faculty of Dramatic Arts, Belgrade (where he graduated in Radio and Theatre Production).

Life and career

1957–77: Early life and teen sensation
Born and raised in Belgrade, Serbia (then Yugoslavia), Lekovic began singing in Kolibri Choir in 1962 (at the age of 5). His first big solo performance with the choir was at Dom Sindikata. He performed alongside other stars including Arsen Dedić, Zdravko Colic, Indexi, Oliver Dragojevic, Lola Novaković etc. 

The performance caught the attention of the great composer of children's music entertainment, Aleksandar Korac. With this collaboration, he became one of Serbia's biggest ever pop sensations whilst still in his teens. With almost 1000 performances until 1977, performances at festivals, TV appearances, awards and accolades, and pop hits, he was easily one of Serbia's biggest ever pop sensations whilst still in his teens. So famous was he that he also performed several times for Yugoslav president Tito (for example for Tito's birthday and during foreign delegation events).

1977-90: A change in style and performing in USSR
After returning from the Army (1977 to 1978), Lekovic's style shifted to pop rock. As a Yugoslav star in the USSR, he held around 400 concerts until 1986. He played to over 1 000 000 people in a single tour through multiple cities such as Moscow, St. Petersburg, Novosibirsk etc. He also had concert and television appearances in all major cities of the then Soviet Union (Kiev, Tallinn, Riga, Vilnius, Rostov, Sochi, Kiev, Minsk ..). During this period he also started acting in musicals with main roles in Popeye, Red Riding Hood, Hansel and Gretel, Cinderella and Koprive.

1990-2007: More success and a transformation (as an author of lyrics and producer)

After the breakup of Yugoslavia, the pop, jazz and pop rock scene in the region experienced perhaps some of its darkest days. The record label PGP-RTS took the initiative, with then management of Djordje Minkov. The ambition was to gather the old but new musical forces. Lekovic was always a period ahead of his time. This is partly why he was such a big success, but also explains why sometimes his creativity was not fully appreciated.

Even though his plans in that time were different, he decided once again to accept the offer, or better said, the challenge. He wanted to give support to younger colleagues with the experience he had gained. He became active on the big festival scene once more, but now as a producer, performer, author of lyrics and occasionally as the author of compositions.

In 1991 and 1992, the first two songs that he wrote for singers of folk music, one sung by Biljana Jeftic ("Suzo Jedina" meaning "My Only Tear") and the other sung by Slavko Banjac ("Zaspala mi dusa" meaning "My Soul Fell Asleep")   resulted in a large positive reaction from the viewers and the songs had a huge amount of airplay. However, this time in Bosnia, Serbia, Macedonia and Montenegro. That was now his new market.

In 1992, a group of enthusiasts led by Vojkanom Borisavljevicem initiated the movement of the big music festival in Budva, Pjesma Mediterana in co-production with RTV CG and RTS. For 3 years in a row, 1993/94/95, he appeared at this festival as the singer and writer of the songs "Ti si moj Bog" (meaning "You are My God") which won Award for Best Interpretation, "Probudi se andjele" (meaning "Wake Up Angel") which won Award of the Audience, and "Cinila sis to ti drago" (meaning "You did as you Wished") which won Award for the Best Lyrics. In a period of 3 years, together with his wife, he prepared the second album, but this time as the author of lyrics, performer, and co-producer with the arranger Laza Ristovski. The album was called "Reci mi" (meaning "Tell Me") published by PGP RTS in 1993. One of the episodes of the popular TV show "Muzicki portreti" was dedicated to this album. In 1996, in sales, he appeared with one more album, "Linija dodira" (meaning "Line of Touch"), also published by PGP-RTS. On this album, as bonus tracks, there were previously published songs (with independent festival labels). 
From 1993, Lekovic has been heavily involved in producing star singers.   He has produced and written lyrics for songs which appear in over 30 CD's of different artists. Many of which were hit songs and won several awards. He produced and wrote for almost all major performers of folk and pop music, that include Ogi Radivojevic, Merima Njegomir, Adrijana Bozovic, Marija Serifovic, Sanja Đorđević, Tose Proeski, Natasa Bekvalac, Goca Trzan, Koktel Bend, Jellena, Cakana, Ekstra Nena, Maja Odzaklijevska etc.

2007-Present: Actor and Producer

Lekovic expanded his creative talents to act as Bishop Myriel in the play  Les Misérables at the Madlenianum Opera and Theatre. The show premiered at BEMUS and so far has had an audience of over 20 000 people, with over 50 performances. The success of Zoran Lekovic the actor resulted in more roles such as now also playing Frank Crawley and Giles in the musical " Rebeka, also at the Madlenianum Opera and Theatre.

He is still works as a producer but has become very selective in his choice of projects. He also works alongside his wife, Nena Lekovic, a renowned composer in Serbia who has worked with numerous popstars. He has two children, both very immersed in the creative scene; Maya Lekovic, a singer, composer and producer who composed for pop stars, selling her first song at the age of thirteen. She now works in Amsterdam, Netherlands as the owner of her own Music Production Agency, writing music for film and ad, and music for pop. And Nemanja Lekovic who acted as Gavroche in Les Misérables and now studies TV and Film Production at the Faculty of Dramatic Arts, Belgrade.

Discography

Albums
 1972 Za Nas Dvoje PGP-RTS
 1986 Patike Od Sedam Milja (with Suzana Mancic) PGP-RTS
 1994 Reci Mi PGP-RTS
 1996 Linija Dodira PGP-RTS

Singles
 1971 Ona Je Najlepša / Ona Me Voli PGP-RTS
 1971 Niko, Niko PGP-RTS
 1972 Sanija / Hej, Hej PGP-RTS
 1972 Snežana / Život Je Lep PGP-RTS
 1973 Koliba PGP-RTS
 1973 Daj Mi Ruke Svoje PGP-RTS
 1973 Nemoj Kriti Lice / Malena Moja PGP-RTS
 1975 Ljubav Je Svud Oko Nas PGP-RTS
 1978 Put Broj Dva PGP-RTS

References

1957 births
Living people
Serbian composers
Yugoslav male singers
20th-century Serbian male singers
Serbian pop singers
Serbian singer-songwriters
Serbian male actors
Serbian producers
Singers from Belgrade
University of Arts in Belgrade alumni